El Barco sale a las diez is a 1948 Argentine film directed by Francisco Múgica.

Cast

External links
 
 

1948 films
1940s Spanish-language films
Argentine black-and-white films
Films directed by Francisco Múgica
Argentine mystery films
1948 mystery films
1940s Argentine films